Wilma Jacqueline Mansveld (born 11 September 1962) is a Dutch politician of the Labour Party (PvdA). She served as Undersecretary for Infrastructure and Environment, dealing with water policy, environment and aviation in the Second Rutte cabinet from 5 November 2012 until 28 October 2015. Before that she was a member of the States of Groningen from 2007 to 2011 and afterwards a member of the Provincial-Executive of the same province from 2011 to 2012. Mansveld worked as an accountant for Jaguar Cars Netherlands and was secretary of the Social-Economic Council North Netherlands from 2001 to 2011.

References

External links
Official
  W.J. (Wilma) Mansveld Parlement & Politiek

 
 

1962 births
Living people
Dutch accountants
Dutch women in politics
Dutch expatriates in Canada
Labour Party (Netherlands) politicians
Politicians from Groningen (city)
People from Hilversum
Dutch human resource management people
Members of the Provincial-Executive of Groningen
Members of the Provincial Council of Groningen
State Secretaries for Infrastructure of the Netherlands